Drumballyroney is a civil parish in County Down, Northern Ireland. It is situated in the historic barony of Iveagh Upper, Lower Half.

Settlements
The civil parish contains the following settlements:
Rathfriland

Townlands
Drumballyroney civil parish contains the following townlands:

Annahunshigo
Aughnavallog
Ballybrick
Ballynamagna
Ballyroney
Cavan
Drumarkin
Drumdreenagh
Edenagarry
Grallaghgreenan
Imdel
Lackan
Lisnacreevy
Lisnacroppan
Lisnavaghrog
Lisnisk
Lissize
Moneygore
Rossconor
Seafin
Tirfergus
Tirkelly
Tirygory

See also
List of civil parishes of County Down

References